Francisco Alfred 'Frank' Bryans (3 July 1901 – 15 December 1963) was an Argentine first-class cricketer and tennis player.

Byrans made his debut in first-class cricket for Argentina against the Marylebone Cricket Club (MCC) at Buenos Aires in December 1926. He played three further first-class matches against the touring MCC in January 1927. His next appearances in first-class cricket came for Argentina against the touring Sir J Cahn's XI in March 1930, with Bryans making three appearances. In seven first-class matches for Argentina, he scored 186 runs at an average of 16.90 and a high score of 65. With the ball, he took 13 wickets at a bowling average of 23.07, with best figures of 5 for 67. He later played two first-class matches for H. D. G. Leveson Gower's XI in 1933 at Eastbourne, playing against Oxford University and Cambridge University. He scored 54 runs in these two matches and took 5 wickets.

As a tennis player, Bryans twice took part in Wimbledon. In the 1926 Men's Singles he was defeated in the first-round by George Cholmondeley, while in the 1933 Men's Singles he was again defeated in the first-round, this time by Alan Brown. Bryans served as the president of the Argentine Cricket Association from 1956–60. He died at Buenos Aires in December 1963.

References

External links

1901 births
1963 deaths
Argentine male tennis players
Argentine cricketers
H. D. G. Leveson Gower's XI cricketers
20th-century Argentine people